The Curse of Buckout Road is a 2017 Canadian horror film written and directed by Matthew Currie Holmes and starring Evan Ross, Henry Czerny and Dominique Provost-Chalkley.  It is Currie Holmes' directorial debut.

Plot
Aaron Powell returns home from the Naval Postgraduate School to his grandfather, a brilliant psychiatrist, Lawrence Powell. Dr. Powell and his colleague, police detective Roy Harris, are investigating a recent suicide of college professor Stephanie Hancock, who suffered of nightmares involved the infamous urban legends of Buckout Road. While they think she was mentally unstable, Mrs. Hancock's student Cleo Harris starts to show the same symptoms as she was working on an assignment about Buckout Road urban myth. Cleo and Aaron realize that they have to solve the mystery of how to stop the evil before it takes their souls as well.

Cast
 Evan Ross as Aaron Powell
 Henry Czerny as Detective Roy Harris
 Dominique Provost-Chalkley as Cleo Harris
 Colm Feore as Reverend Mike Reagan
 Danny Glover as Dr. Lawrence Powell

Production
The film was shot in Greater Sudbury in 2016.

Release
The film premiered at the Blood in the Snow Canadian Film Festival in 2017.

Reception
The film has a 63% rating on Rotten Tomatoes.  JimmyO of JoBlo.com gave the film a 7 out of 10.

References

External links
 
 

2017 films
Canadian horror films
English-language Canadian films
2017 horror films
Films shot in Greater Sudbury
2010s English-language films
2010s Canadian films